Auldgirth railway station was a station which served Auldgirth, in the Scottish county of Dumfries and Galloway. It was served by trains on what is now known as the Glasgow South Western Line north of Dumfries. The latter station is now the nearest to Auldgirth.

History
Opened by the Glasgow, Dumfries and Carlisle Railway, which became part of the Glasgow and South Western Railway it became part of the London Midland and Scottish Railway during the Grouping of 1923, passing on to the Scottish Region of British Railways during the nationalisation of 1948. It was then closed by British Railways.

The site today

Trains still pass the site on the Glasgow South Western Line.

References

 
 
 
 Station on navigable O.S. map

External links
 RAILSCOT on Glasgow, Dumfries and Carlisle Railway 

Disused railway stations in Dumfries and Galloway
Railway stations in Great Britain opened in 1849
Railway stations in Great Britain closed in 1952
Former Glasgow and South Western Railway stations
1849 establishments in Scotland
1952 disestablishments in Scotland